The Stables Theatre may refer to more than one topic
 Stables Theatre, Sydney in Darlinghurst, also known as the SBW Stables Theatre 
 The Stables, a theatre and music venue in Wavendon, Milton Keynes